Nadica Božanić (born 13 March 2001) is a Serbian taekwondo practitioner. She won the gold medal in the women's middleweight event at the 2022 World Taekwondo Championships held in Guadalajara, Mexico.

She won the silver medal in the girls' 63kg event at the 2018 Summer Youth Olympics held in Buenos Aires, Argentina.

She represented Serbia at the 2022 Mediterranean Games held in Oran, Algeria. She competed in the women's +67kg event where she was eliminated in her second match.

References

External links 
 
 

Living people
2001 births
Place of birth missing (living people)
Serbian female taekwondo practitioners
Taekwondo practitioners at the 2018 Summer Youth Olympics
World Taekwondo Championships medalists
Competitors at the 2022 Mediterranean Games
Mediterranean Games competitors for Serbia
21st-century Serbian women